The Commission to Preserve National Monuments of Bosnia and Herzegovina, (KONS), is Bosnia and Herzegovina commission (agency) which declares and registers national monuments, including sites, natural/urban/architectural assembles, immovable and movable heritage of historical and cultural importance to Bosnia and Herzegovina, as an institution at state level.
The sites of exclusively natural heritage are not subject of Annex 8 and the Commission.

Establishment and legal scope
In accordance to Annex 8 of Dayton Agreement and Act concerning the Commission to Preserve National Monuments of Bosnia and Herzegovina passed by Presidency of Bosnia and Herzegovina at 119. session from December 21, 2001, where The Commission to Preserve National Monuments of Bosnia and Herzegovina is established pursuant to Annex 8 of the General Framework Agreement for Peace in Bosnia and Herzegovina, and basic principles and objectives of the Commission activities established, as well as its primary tasks and authorizations as Bosnia and Herzegovina institution.
 
Act was issued by Official Gazette of Bosnia and Herzegovina, No. 1/02 i 10/02., and Official Gazette of the Federation of Bosnia and Herzegovina No. 2/02, 27/02 and 6/04/.

For declaration of the property to be the national monuments, property and political criterion are not of special importance. However, since 2016 three native members of the Commission are picked on the basis of their ethnicity (Bosniak, Croat and Serb), and regardless of their prior or current political engagements, which could prove to be controversial.

Regulation of conduct and procedures
Regulation of conduct and procedures in a framework of the Commission to Preserve National Monuments of Bosnia and Herzegovina are as stipulated in most recent Act of the Presidency of Bosnia and Herzegovina, from May 26, 2016 - under principal provisions, methodology, procedures, cooperation with institutions and official bodies, transparency, and final articles.

Commissioners
At the 119th session held on 21 December 2001, elected members of the Commission for period 2002 to February 2016:
Dubravko Lovrenović, (Ph.D., Professor of history at University of Sarajevo)
Amra Hadžimuhamedović
Ljiljana Ševo
Tina Wik, (until June 2008)
Zeynep Ahunbay, (Turkey)
Martin Cherry, (UK)
András J. Riedlmayer, (Bibliographer in Islamic Art and Architecture in Fine Arts Library at Harvard University, US)

Members of the Commission since February 2016
Amir Pašić, Ph.D., Professor of architecture - President of the Commission
Radoje Vidović, Professor of history and geography - Deputy President of the Commission
Goran Milojević, Architect - Deputy President of the Commission

Internal Organization of the Commission (Secretariat)
The Secretariat is managed and organized by the Executive officer, and is structured with the Executive officer, the Secretariat of the Commission, and the Associate experts, the Librarian and documentarist, and the Technical secretary, as follows:

The Executive officer

Mirzah Fočo, (Architect - conservator)

The Secretariat of the Commission, consists of:

Executive officer: Mirzah Fočo
Assistant to the executive officer for the heritage: Mirela Mulalić Handan
Assistant to the executive officer for legal affairs: Branka Mekić
Advisor for technical coordination (chief of staff): Damir Bačvić

The Associate experts consists of:

 Associates for architectural heritage monuments

 Associates for architectural heritage ensembles and cultural landscapes
 Associate for archaeology
 Associate for the implementation of the World Heritage Convention
 Art historian associate
 Budget and public procurements associate
 Finance associate
 International law associate
 Public relations associate

The Librarian and documentarist

The Technical secretary.

Criteria to designate the properties as National Monuments

The Commission to Preserve National Monuments declares legal protection of the property to be the national monument on the ground of criteria based on subject, scope and value of each property.

I. Subjects of legal protection

A. Portable cultural property
Portable cultural property, individual or in collections, classified as follows:
 small objects (home furnishings, clothing, working equipment, tools, handicraft products, etc.)
 paintings,
 books,
 sculptures,
 building fragments,
 inscriptions, etc.

B. Immovable cultural property

1. Historic buildings and monuments
 residential,
 religious,
 educational,
 administrative,
 public,
 commercial,
 infrastructure,
 military,
 hygienic,
 agricultural,
 industrial, etc.

2. Groups of buildings
Groups of buildings which are either part of a composition with a certain purpose or an agglomeration which is the result of continuous building in a historic core.
 residential,
 religious,
 educational,
 administrative,
 public,
 commercial,
 infrastructure,
 military,
 hygienic,
 agricultural,
 industrial, etc.

3. Sites
 urban,
 rural,
 archaeological,
 historical,
 industrial,
 cultural landscape
 natural site related to some ritual or tradition,
 natural-scientific,
 mixed.

II. Value

A. Time frame
Properties arisen from the prehistoric times until the end of the 20th century.

B. Historic value
Association of a building, or group or place to a historic figure in the history or a significant event in the history.

C. Artistic and aesthetic value
i. Quality of workmanship,
ii. Quality of material,
iii. Proportions,
iv. Composition,
v. Value of a detail,
vi. Structural value.

D. Clarity
Documentary, scientific and educational or pedagogic value.
i. Material evidence about less known historic era,
ii. Evidence of historic changes,
iii. Work of a famous artist or builder,
iv. Evidence of certain type, style or regional manner,
v. Evidence of a typical lifestyle in the certain era.

E. Symbolic value
i. Ontology value,
ii. Sacral value,
iii. Traditional value,
iv. Relation to the rituals or traditions,
v. Significance for the identity of a group of people.

F. Townscape/Landscape value
i. Relation of the form in the comparison with other parts of the group,
ii. Meaning in the townscape,
iii. A building or a group of buildings is a part of a group or site.

G. Authenticity
i. Form and design,
ii. Materials and substance,
iii. Use and function,
iv. Traditions and techniques,
v. Location and setting,
vi. Spirit and feeling, and
vii. Other internal and external factors.

H. Uniqueness/rarity
i. The single or rare example of an object type or style,
ii. A masterpiece of workmanship or course,
iii. Work of a prominent artist/ architect, craftsman.

I. Integrity (groups, sites, collections)
i. Material wholeness,
ii. Homogeneity,
iii. Completeness,
iv. Unimpaired condition.

Official Gazette
Act was issued by Official Gazette of Bosnia and Herzegovina, No. 1/02 i 10/02., and Official Gazette of the Federation of Bosnia and Herzegovina No. 2/02, 27/02 and 6/04/. All later acts and decisions are consequently published also.

Criteria are published in the Official Gazette of BiH and the Official Gazettes of both Entities of Bosnia and Herzegovina and of Brčko District of Bosnia and Herzegovina.

See also
List of National Monuments of Bosnia and Herzegovina
List of World Heritage Sites in Bosnia and Herzegovina
List of fortifications in Bosnia and Herzegovina
List of bridges in Bosnia and Herzegovina
List of World War II monuments and memorials in Bosnia and Herzegovina
List of People's Heroes of Yugoslavia monuments in Bosnia and Herzegovina
List of museums in Bosnia and Herzegovina

References

Further reading
For the criteria see English website: Commission to preserve national monuments (or chose language: Commission to preserve national monuments - old website is also still in use as an archive;
for the UNESCO criteria see the Selection criteria.

External links
Commission to preserve national monuments
Commission to preserve national monuments (old website in use as an archive)

 
 
Bosnia and Herzegovina
Heritage registers in Bosnia and Herzegovina